Oakham House is a historic building in Toronto, Ontario, Canada. The house is located at the southwest corner of Gould and Church streets. It was designed by architect William Thomas as his own residence and office, and completed in 1848. Today, it is owned by Toronto Metropolitan University. The upper level consists of a cafe used by students and faculty, while the lower level is home to a student pub. The building is also used by the university to hold events and receptions.

The house has a predominantly Gothic Revival architectural style. Thomas' office was located in a wing on Gould Street; however, it was later replaced by an addition to the residential part of the building. Murals in the front hall depicted rural scenes.

Architecture
Oakham House was constructed with yellow-brick masonry on a stone foundation and topped with a slate roof. Pinnacles ornament the roofline, with two on each side of Oakham House's two front gables. The house exhibits many other Gothic elements such as the various carved-stone head sculptures on its facade. The carved-stone heads with garlands on their brows can also be seen at the base of the pinnacles. There are ten stone heads on the facade of the house.

The entrance on Church Street consists of a pointed arch by multiple mouldings. This entrance is framed with engaged columns with figured capitals. A square with an ornate T is present on top of the front door and below the centre window. It has small shields on either side with heraldic devices and a coat of arms. The name of the building, "Oakham House", was carved in stone, and this sign was mounted above the front door. Two iron dogs facing each other, with iron rings in their mouths for hitching horses used to be present at the curb of the house. They were painted red in order to represent Chesapeake Bay Retrievers. Later on, the dogs were removed from the curb and mounted on the front entrance near the steps and were repainted black. The "Oakham House" sign along with the iron dogs have now been removed.

Over the years, the house has gone through some major transformations mainly on the interior as it has been utilized by different individuals and organizations. Shortly before Thomas died in 1860, he sold the house to John McGee. Along with his family, McGee lived in the house until he sold it to the city in 1892. In 1899, it became the "Home for Working Boys". An addition was completed in 1900. In 1958, the house was sold to the Ontario Government and was given to the Ryerson Institute of Technology (now Toronto Metropolitan University). It was then used as a student residence but is now used by Toronto Metropolitan University for student amenities such as dining and for receptions and events at the institution.

References

See also
List of oldest buildings and structures in Toronto

Houses in Toronto
Toronto Metropolitan University buildings
William Thomas (architect) buildings
Houses completed in 1848
Gothic Revival architecture in Toronto
1848 establishments in Ontario